Christine Wolf (born 5 March 1989) is an Austrian professional golfer.

Wolf is a graduate of the University of Tennessee at Chattanooga.

Wolf turned professional in 2012 and played on the LET Access Series from 2012 to 2013, winning one event. She has played on the Ladies European Tour since 2014.

In 2015, Wolf finished runner-up to Holly Clyburn at the NSW Women's Open, an ALPG Tour event.

Wolf qualified for the 2016 Summer Olympics, finishing in the 43rd place.

Professional wins

Ladies European Tour wins (1)
2019 Hero Women's Indian Open

LET Access Series wins (1)
2012 Crete Ladies Open

Team appearances
Amateur
European Ladies' Team Championship (representing Austria): 2007, 2008, 2009, 2010

Professional
European Championships (representing Austria): 2018

References

External links

Austrian female golfers
Ladies European Tour golfers
Olympic golfers of Austria
Golfers at the 2016 Summer Olympics
Golfers at the 2020 Summer Olympics
University of Tennessee at Chattanooga alumni
People from Innsbruck-Land District
Sportspeople from Innsbruck
1989 births
Living people